The 2020 Vet Tix/Camping World 200 was a NASCAR Gander RV & Outdoors Truck Series race held on June 6, 2020, at Atlanta Motor Speedway in Hampton, Georgia. Contested over 136 laps due to an overtime finish on the 1.54-mile-long (2.48 km) asphalt quad-oval intermediate speedway, it was the fourth race of the 2020 NASCAR Gander RV & Outdoors Truck Series season. Grant Enfinger, driving for ThorSport Racing, won the race, his 2nd win this season. Johnny Sauter was going to be awarded a third place finish, but after a tire violation, he was disqualified to a dead last finish.

The 2020 Vet Tix/Camping World 200 is the same race as the Henry Ford Health System 200.

Entry list

Qualifying 
For qualifying, drivers will line up based on last year's owner points.

Qualifying results

Race

Stage Results 
Stage One Laps: 31

Stage Two Laps: 40

Final Stage Results 
Stage Three Laps: 50

References

2020 in sports in Georgia (U.S. state)
Vet Tix/Camping World 200
NASCAR races at Atlanta Motor Speedway
2020 NASCAR Gander RV & Outdoors Truck Series